Ezra Otis Kendall was an American professor, astronomer and mathematician. He was known for his work in uranography.

Kendall was born on May 17, 1818, in Wilmington, Massachusetts to parents Ezra Kendall and Susanna Cook Walker. His mother was a descendant of Mayflower passengers Francis Cooke and Stephen Hopkins. In 1835, he moved to Philadelphia to study mathematics with Sears Cook Walker, his half-brother. In 1838, he became professor of mathematics and astronomy at Philadelphia's Central High School and director of the observatory. In 1842, he was elected a member of the  American Philosophical Society and later served as a vice-president. In 1855, he became professor of mathematics and astronomy at the University of Pennsylvania, and in 1883 became vice-provost and dean of the college faculty. He received a Doctor of Laws, LL.D., honorary degree from the university in 1888 for his scientific work. He died on January 5, 1899, in Philadelphia and is buried in the Saint Luke's Episcopal Churchyard.

Works

References

External links 

1818 births
1899 deaths
People from Wilmington, Massachusetts
University of Pennsylvania faculty
Mathematicians at the University of Pennsylvania
American astronomers
19th-century American mathematicians